Thapelo Tale (born 22 April 1988) is a Mosotho footballer who plays as a striker for Likhopo.

Career
Thapelo Tale played with FC Likhopo from Maseru before moving in August 2011 to Serbia to play with FK Srem.

He made his senior debut for Likhopo in 2007. During the following seasons he became among the best strikers in the country, and he became a member of the national team. Usually among the strongest domestic teams, Likhopo failed to win the domestic championship during the period Tale was in the club, and it was only in 2010 that they managed to win the Vodacom Soccer Spectacular. That same year, Tale had his first trial with FK Srem in Serbia, however Likhopo President only wanted to agree to a loan. The following year, in April 2011, Tale went again to Serbia, this time along his national team teammate Nkau Lerotholi, to trials with a top league Serbian club FK Jagodina, however both of them did not stayed in the team, and Tale went back to FK Srem who still wanted to sign him since his previous trial a year earlier.

After confirming his health form and after the agreement between the two clubs was reached, Tale finally joined Srem in late August 2011 making his league debut on September 4 in a match against RFK Novi Sad, already counting for the 4th round of the 2011–12 Serbian First League, the second Serbian tier.

At the end of the season Srem got relegated, and Tale returned to FC Likhopo, but soon after he was back in Europe, this time joining FC Andorra, an Andorran club playing in Spanish football league system.

National team
Thapelo Tale has been a member of the Lesotho U-17 and U-20 teams.

In 2008, he made his debut for the Lesotho national football team, and since then has made over 40 appearances.

International goals
Scores and results list Lesotho's goal tally first.

Honours
Likhopo
Vodacom Soccer Spectacular: 2010

References

External links

 Thapelo Tale at Serbian First League official website
 Thapelo Tale at Srbijafudbal

1988 births
Living people
Lesotho footballers
Lesotho international footballers
Lesotho expatriate footballers
Association football forwards
FK Srem players
Expatriate footballers in Serbia
FC Andorra players
Expatriate footballers in Andorra
People from Maseru
Likhopo FC players